Iqbal is an Indian politician and a member of the 15th and 16th Legislative Assembly of Uttar Pradesh of India. He represents the Chandpur constituency of Uttar Pradesh and is a member of the Bahujan Samaj Party political party.

Early life and education
Iqbal was born in Bijnor district, Uttar Pradesh. He received education till twelfth grade. Before being elected as MLA, he used to work as a businessperson.

Political career
Iqbal has been a MLA for two straight terms and represents the Chandpur constituency. He is a member of the Bahujan Samaj Party political party.

Posts Held

See also
Chandpur
Uttar Pradesh Legislative Assembly
Government of India
Politics of India
Bahujan Samaj Party

References 

Bahujan Samaj Party politicians from Uttar Pradesh
Uttar Pradesh MLAs 2012–2017
Uttar Pradesh MLAs 2007–2012
People from Bijnor district
1954 births
Living people